The sandburrowers or simply burrowers are a family, Creediidae, of fishes in the order Perciformes.

They are native to coastal waters the Indian and Pacific Oceans. They are very small fishes; with the exception of the larger Donaldson's sandburrower, Limnichthys donaldsoni, most species reach only 3 to 7 cm in length. They live in shallow waters close to the shore, burrowing into sandy areas swept by currents or by surf.

See also
List of fish families

References 

 
Trachiniformes